In mathematics, the n-th symmetric power of an object X is the quotient of the n-fold product  by the permutation action of the symmetric group .

More precisely, the notion exists at least in the following three areas:
In linear algebra, the n-th symmetric power of a vector space V is the vector subspace of the symmetric algebra of V consisting of degree-n elements (here the product is a tensor product).
In algebraic topology, the n-th symmetric power of a topological space X is the quotient space , as in the beginning of this article.
In algebraic geometry, a symmetric power is defined in a way similar to that in algebraic topology. For example, if  is an affine variety, then the GIT quotient  is the n-th symmetric power of X.

References

External links 

Symmetric relations